Casimir of Poland may refer to:
 Any ruler of Poland named Casimir:
 Duke Casimir I the Restorer (101658)
 High Duke Casimir II the Just (113894)
 King Casimir III the Great (131070)
 King Casimir IV Jagiellon (142792)
 Saint Casimir (145884), Polish–Lithuanian prince

See also 
 Kazimierz (disambiguation), the Polish form of the name Casimir